Classic Legends is an Indian television Hindi entertainment show based on the notable and talented people of the Hindi film industry. The first four seasons of the show were aired on Zee Classic. The fifth season airs on Zee Anmol Cinema, Zee Bollywood and Zee Cinema HD. The show is presented by popular Bollywood lyricist, Javed Akhtar. In the show, Javed Akhtar explores the lives of great artists from the golden era of Bollywood who graced the silverscreen with their powerful performances. The first season of show premièred on 11 December 2011 followed by four other seasons.

Each episode takes on one artist while the series covers people who were popular actors, actresses, music composers, directors, singers and lyricists.

Season 1 

The series is presented by Javed Akhtar. Every season has a total of 13 episodes, each exploring the life of a famous personality from the Hindi film Industry. The first season was aired from Dec 11, 2011-Mar 4, 2012. The season featured stories of a variety of people from the film industry ranging from Raj Kapoor to Guru Dutt, Nargis to Kishore Kumar and lyricists like Sahir Ludhianvi to name a few.

Season 2 

After an overwhelming response to the first season, the second season was aired barely eight months after the first season ended. The season was aired from Nov 18, 2012-Feb 10, 2013. In this season, Dilip Kumar's biography was extended to the next episode.So, instead of 13, biography of 12 personalities was shared. The season featured the anecdotes from the life of actors like Dilip Kumar and Dev Anand, singer Mohammad Rafi and lyricist Shailendra.
Meena Kumari was the only actress whose story featured in this season.

Season 3 
The season three was aired from Nov 2, 2014-Jan 25, 2015. Unlike other seasons, no lyricist was discussed, however, for the first time the life incidents of two singers were shared, instead of one. This season featured stories of stars like Nutan and Sanjeev Kumar, directors like Yash Chopra and singer Lata Mangeshkar.

Season 4 
After a gap of more than two years, the fourth season was aired from Sep 24, 2017-Dec 17, 2017. The season featured stories of artists like Rajendra Kumar, Vyjayanthimala, singer Asha Bhosle and composers Laxmikant Pyarelal. The final episode of this season was touted as a tribute to veteran actor Shashi Kapoor who passed away thirteen days before the episode aired.

Season 5 
With the show doing fabulously well and on popular demand, the show was back with Season 5 commencing from 8 December 2018. It airs on 3 channels - Zee Anmol Cinema, Zee Bollywood and Zee Cinema HD. For the first time, biography of not one but two people featured in a single episode. Final episode of this season was aired on 2 March 2019.

See also
 Bollywood
 Cinema of India
 Jaane Pehchaane with Javed Akhtar

References

External links
 Zee Classic official website
 Classic Legends Season 5 with Javed Akhtar

Hindi-language television shows